Usón is a locality located in the municipality of Huerto, in Huesca province, Aragon, Spain. As of 2020, it has a population of 28.

Geography 
Usón is located 40km southeast of Huesca.

References

Populated places in the Province of Huesca